McClintock High School is a high school located in Tempe, Arizona, approximately two miles southeast of the campus of Arizona State University. McClintock High School was established in 1964. The school was named after James H. McClintock.

McClintock has approximately 1,900 students and offers a wide variety of curriculum, which includes honors, advanced placement, dual credit, and the Peggy Payne Academy for gifted students. The school also has state-recognized ELL and Special Education programs. McClintock is an open enrollment campus.

The campus was designed in 1964 by local architect Kemper Goodwin. 

Artist Ka Graves served as artist-in-residence at McClintock High School in 1979 and 1980.

Peggy Payne Academy
The Peggy Payne Academy for Academic Excellence, or PPA, is a program for gifted students at McClintock. Founded in 2001 with 44 students, the program now serves hundreds of students in all major academic subjects.

Athletics

Football
McClintock High School played its home games at Goodwin Stadium until its own lighted stadium, Jim Lyon's Stadium, was constructed.

McClintock's main rival in football has been Tempe High School since 1964. Tempe and McClintock have annual, non-conference rivalry games. McClintock has been the historical favorite in the matchup, although returning to their dominance since 2017.

The Chargers' first state football title came in 1977, when the team went undefeated and captured the championship with a 14–9 playoff victory over Phoenix's Washington High School. Three years later, the Chargers posted a 12–2 record and won their second title by defeating Phoenix's Trevor Browne High School in the 1980 championship game. Their third state title in 1989 capped a 13–2 season that ended with a 42–14 playoff victory over Mesa's Westwood High.

Recent state and national championships
2022 – Division II Boys Track & Field Team Champions
2012 – Division III Marching Band Champions
2010 – Spiritline National Champions
2010 – 4A-I Boys' Basketball State Champions
2007 – 4A-I Boys' Baseball State Champions

Notable alumni

Jules Asner – actress
Tony Carrillo – comics artist
Futuristic – rapper
Doug Hopkins – former musician with the Gin Blossoms
Tank Johnson – football player
Jason Kyle – football player
Jeff Larish – baseball player
Bill Leen – musician with the Gin Blossoms
Dan Manucci – football player
Mike Mendoza – baseball player
Rick Neuheisel – football player, college head coach and broadcaster
Anthony Parker – football player
Shawn Patterson – football player
Matt Perisho – baseball player
David Tab Rasmussen (1958–2014) – biological anthropologist
Jason Butler Rote (aka Jason Rote) – TV/film writer-creator (animation)
Bridget S. Bade - attorney and federal judge
James G. Stavridis - U.S. Navy admiral, diplomat, author, educator
John Tait – football player 
Kenny Wheaton – football player
Robin Wilson - frontman of the Gin Blossoms

References

Public high schools in Arizona
Education in Tempe, Arizona
Schools in Maricopa County, Arizona
Educational institutions established in 1964
1964 establishments in Arizona